GainJet is a private charter airline and management company with its headquarters in Glyfada, Greece.

Overview
GainJet commenced operations in April 2006, upon acquiring its EU-OPS-1 air operator's certificate, allowing the company to commercially operate worldwide. GainJet's executive aircraft serve government, corporate and individual charter, while its aircraft management service is involved in maintenance management, sales, management, and repossession. Its network includes a sales office in London at Heathrow Airport. GainJet's Boeing 757 flew the England national football team for the World Cup in Russia on 12 June 2018. On the 8th of July 2019, they brought the United States women’s national football team back home after they won the 2019 FIFA Women's World Cup in Lyon, France.

Fleet

Current fleet

The GainJet Aviation charter fleet is based throughout Europe and the Middle-East, and includes the following aircraft:

Former fleet 
The airline previously operated the following aircraft:
1 Boeing 737-300
1 Boeing 737-700

Criticism
GainJet has been criticized and the subject of litigation for their role in the alleged kidnapping and rendition of Rwandan dissident Paul Rusesabagina.

References

External links
GainJet Aviation

Airlines of Greece
Airlines established in 2006
Greek companies established in 2006